William Beier (born November 2, 1982 in Manila, Philippines) is a Filipino born German former competitive ice dancer. He competed with his sister, Christina Beier. They are four-time (2005–2006, 2008, 2010) German national champions, and represented Germany in the 2010 Winter Olympics.

The Beiers moved from the Philippines to Germany in 1990. William Beier began skating when he was eight. He was a singles skater for two years and then took up ice dancing with his sister, Christina Beier.

In 2004, the couple changed trainers and training facilities, training with Martin Skotnický in Oberstdorf.

In May 2008, the Beiers announced the end of their dance partnership. They teamed up again following the 2008-09 season and qualified for the Winter Olympics. The Beiers ended their competitive career in 2010.

Competitive highlights
GP: Grand Prix; JGP: Junior Grand Prix

with Christina Beier

References

Patinage magazine No. 124, Nov/Dec 2010

External links

 

Living people
German male ice dancers
Filipino people of German descent
1982 births
People from Manila
Figure skaters at the 2010 Winter Olympics
Olympic figure skaters of Germany